David Thompson Secondary School, located in Invermere, British Columbia, serves grades 8-12 for students from as far south as Canal Flats to as far north as Spillimacheen. There are four schools that feed DTSS: JA Laird Elementary, Windermere Elementary, Edgewater Elementary, and Martin Morigeau Elementary.

DTSS is currently on a combined semester, term and linear system. The schedule has five 65-minute classes per day which rotate based on the day of the week. The Friday schedule has only four classes of 65 minutes.

The school has a student population of approximately 380 students. There are 38 teachers, 3 administrators, and several support staff at David Thompson Secondary.

Notable alumni
Christine Keshen - Curler and olympic bronze medalist
Wade Dubielewicz - Former professional ice hockey player

References

External links
 David Thompson Secondary Homepage

School Reports - Ministry of Education
 Class Size
 Satisfaction Survey
 School Performance
 Skills Assessment

High schools in British Columbia
Educational institutions in Canada with year of establishment missing